Bert Konterman (born 14 January 1971) is a Dutch former professional footballer who played as a defender.

Playing career
Born in Rouveen, Konterman's career began with the local amateur club SC Rouveen, then went on to play for clubs in the Dutch Eredivisie including FC Zwolle, Cambuur, Willem II.

In summer 1998, he moved to Feyenoord on a four-year contract.

Konterman was snapped up by Dick Advocaat in 2000 to play for Rangers for a fee of £4.5 million. He was part of a growing Dutch influence at Ibrox under Advocaat, but did not make a similarly impressive impact to the likes of Ronald de Boer and Arthur Numan. He endured a difficult start at Ibrox in defence; however, following the arrival of Alex McLeish, Konterman was often used in an advanced role in the heart of the midfield. In this position, he had a more successful spell at the club including netting a winning strike after extra time from 30 yards against arch rivals Celtic in a League Cup semi-final. Konterman went on to play in the final against Ayr United, however a persistent toe injury meant the League Cup Final was his final appearance of the season. This meant he missed out on Rangers' victory in the 2002 Scottish Cup Final. The following season, 2002–03, brought even more success as Konterman helped Rangers win a domestic treble of league, Scottish Cup and Scottish League Cup. Konterman contributed 16 league appearances to their title winning campaign and also played as they won the 2003 Scottish League Cup Final. However he didn't feature in the 2003 Scottish Cup Final.

After a three-year spell with Rangers and winning six caps for the Netherlands national team, Konterman returned home in the summer of 2003 signing for SBV Vitesse.

He retired in June 2004.

Managerial career
After retiring, Konterman began coaching at football camps. In 2009 he took up the position of technical director at Dutch club FC Zwolle in 2009. Konterman was going to be the head coach of the club's U15s and support the other coaches at the club.

In October 2011, he was also appointed assistant manager of Wim van Zwam for Netherlands U19 national team. On 1 July 2012, he stepped down from his position at Zwolle.

On 3 September 2013, he was appointed assistant manager for Jong FC Twente. In addition to his work for Jong FC Twente, Konterman would also continue as an assistant coach for Netherlands' 19s. Konterman had several roles at Twente, including supporting the coaches of the U19s and the first team. From 2014 to 2017, he was the head coach of the U19s.

In June 2017, Konterman took charge of Netherlands U18 national team and was also going to be assistant manager of the U17s. In the following season, he was promoted to U20 national team manager. On 26 February 2020, he was also appointed caretaker manager of the U19s following Maarten Stekelenburg's promotion to the A-team.

Personal life
Konterman is a Christian.

Honours
Feyenoord
 Eredivisie: 1998–99
 Johan Cruyff Shield: 1999

Rangers
Scottish Premier League: 2003
Scottish League Cup: 2002, 2003

References

External links
 
 

1971 births
Living people
People from Staphorst
Dutch footballers
Association football defenders
Netherlands international footballers
UEFA Euro 2000 players
Eredivisie players
Scottish Premier League players
PEC Zwolle players
SC Cambuur players
Willem II (football club) players
Feyenoord players
Rangers F.C. players
SBV Vitesse players
Dutch football managers
PEC Zwolle managers
Eredivisie managers
Dutch expatriate footballers
Dutch expatriate sportspeople in Scotland
Expatriate footballers in Scotland
Dutch Christians
Footballers from Overijssel